Große or Grosse is a German surname. Notable people with the surname include:

Demetrius Grosse
Maurice Grosse
Katharina Grosse
Ben Grosse
Hans-Werner Grosse
Heinz-Josef Große
Julius Grosse

German-language surnames